The Daredevil Reporter (German: Der Teufelsreporter) is a 1929 German silent thriller film directed by Ernst Laemmle and starring Eddie Polo, Gritta Ley and Maria Forescu. It was the first credited screenplay by Billy Wilder.

The film was made by the German subsidiary of Universal Pictures. The sets were designed by Gustav A. Knauer and Willy Schiller.

Cast
 Eddie Polo as Reporter  
 Gritta Ley as Bessie  
 Maria Forescu as Madame Lourdier  
 Robert Garrison as Jonas  
 Fred Grosser as Maxe

References

Bibliography
 Smedley, Nick. A Divided World: Hollywood Cinema and Emigré Directors in the Era of Roosevelt and Hitler, 1933-1948. Intellect Books, 2011.

External links

1929 films
Films of the Weimar Republic
German silent feature films
Films directed by Ernst Laemmle
1920s thriller films
German thriller films
Films about journalists
German black-and-white films
Universal Pictures films
Silent thriller films
1920s German films